Graeme Crallan (5 June 1958 – 27 July 2008) was a British heavy metal drummer from Hartlepool, England. Also known as Crash Crallan, he formed White Spirit along with Janick Gers in 1975. They released their debut album in 1980. The album flopped and they split up in 1981. Crallan then joined up with Tank in 1984, and played on their Honour & Blood album. He quit the following year.

Crallan attended the wedding of fellow White Spirit member Malcolm Pearson (keyboard) after the split of the band, undertaking the role of Pearson's best-man.

He relocated to London and played in a few other bands. On 27 July 2008, Crallan died at the Royal Free Hospital in Hampstead after sustaining head injuries after a fall in the streets of London.

Early life
Graeme attended Technical High School and High Tunstall School in Hartlepool before moving to London in the early 1980’s.

Discography

White Spirit
 "Backs to the Grind" - 1980 (single)
 "White Spirit" - 1980
 Midnight Chaser - 1981 (single)
 "High Upon High" - 1981 (single)

Tank
 Honour & Blood - 1984
 Live and Rare - 2007

References

External links
NWOBHM.info - White Spirit page
The Official TANK website

1958 births
2008 deaths
People from Hartlepool
Musicians from County Durham
English heavy metal drummers
Accidental deaths in London
Accidental deaths from falls
Tank (band) members
White Spirit (band) members